Teoh Mei Xing (born 6 March 1997) is a Malaysian badminton player. She was the runner-up of the 2016 Swiss International and Scottish Open tournament in the women's doubles event partnered with Amelia Alicia Anscelly. She won her first international title at the 2021 Czech Open in the women's doubles together with Anna Cheong, and they won their first World Tour title at the 2022 Syed Modi International.

Achievements

BWF World Tour (1 title) 
The BWF World Tour, which was announced on 19 March 2017 and implemented in 2018, is a series of elite badminton tournaments sanctioned by the Badminton World Federation (BWF). The BWF World Tours are divided into levels of World Tour Finals, Super 1000, Super 750, Super 500, Super 300 (part of the HSBC World Tour), and the BWF Tour Super 100.

Women's doubles

BWF Grand Prix (1 runner-up) 
The BWF Grand Prix had two levels, the Grand Prix and Grand Prix Gold. It was a series of badminton tournaments sanctioned by the Badminton World Federation (BWF) and played between 2007 and 2017.

Women's doubles

  BWF Grand Prix Gold tournament
  BWF Grand Prix tournament

BWF International Challenge/Series (3 titles, 5 runners-up) 
Women's doubles

Mixed doubles

  BWF International Challenge tournament
  BWF International Series tournament
  BWF Future Series tournament

References

External links 
 BAM talent team
 

Living people
1997 births
People from Selangor
Malaysian sportspeople of Chinese descent
Malaysian female badminton players
21st-century Malaysian women